Rolf Jacobsen may refer to:

Rolf Jacobsen (poet) (1907–1994), Norwegian modernist writer
Rolf Jacobsen (politician) (1865–1942), Norwegian jurist and politician
Rolf Jacobsen (boxer) (1899–1960), Norwegian boxer